Gloeospermum boreale is a species of plant in the family Violaceae. It is endemic to the Honduras.

References

Violaceae
Endemic flora of Honduras
Critically endangered flora of North America
Taxonomy articles created by Polbot